Mankwe is a small settlement north of Pilanesberg and Rustenburg in the North West province of South Africa. It falls under the Moses Kotane Local Municipality and the Bojanala District Municipality.

People
The dancer Motsi Mabuse was born here in 1981 in what was then the nominal Republic of Bophutatswana.

References

Populated places in the Rustenburg Local Municipality